Mustla is a village in Saarde Parish, Pärnu County in southern Estonia.

References 

Villages in Pärnu County